Jordan Montgomery O'Brien (born October 11, 1992) is an American soccer player who plays for the River Plate of the Primera División A since 2019.

Early life
O'Brien was born to Patrick and Jean O'Brien and raised in Huntington Beach, California. Her brother, Kyle, is also a professional soccer player, playing for California United Strikers FC in the NISA. Her dad played soccer as well.

O'Brien, who graduated from Marina High School in 2010, was a four-year letterwinner soccer player at the school. She was a two-time Sunset League MVP (2008, 2010).

As a youth, Watt also played club soccer for the Slammers FC. With the team, she won fourteen state and national titles.

College career
O'Brien attended University of Tulsa from 2010 to 2013 and played for the Tulsa Golden Hurricane women's soccer team under head coach Kyle Cussen. She played four years for the Tulsa Golden Hurricane, finishing her university career with 8 goals and 19 assists in 79 games played. During her career at Tulsa, she was named to the NSCAA/Performance Subaru All-Central Region third team (2010), All-Conference USA First Team (2010), All-Conference USA Third Team (2011, 2012), All-Conference USA Second Team (2013) as well as being awarded the 2010 Conference USA Freshman of the Year. In 2015, O'Brien graduated from Tulsa with a degree in psychology.

Club career

Houston Dash, 2015

O'Brien signed for Houston Dash in 2015. She left at the end of the season and did not make an appearance.

QBIK, 2016
On February 25, 2016, O'Brien signed for QBIK. After having troubles with her visa and being injured, O'Brien was released in June 2016.

KR, 2016
On 6 September 2016, O'Brien scored a brace for KR against Fylkir in the Úrvalsdeild. She also scored a goal in a win against ÍA on 30 September, a win that saved KR from relegation.

Orlando Pride, 2017
On June 16, 2017, the Orlando Pride announced their signing of O'Brien after initially joining the Pride as a training player mid-way through the 2016 NWSL season.

Following the 2017 season, Pride placed O'Brien on the Re-Entry Wire. She was not claimed by another team.

Avaldsnes, 2018
O'Brien signed with Avaldsnes IL on July 13, 2018.
On 10 August, she scored on her debut against ŽFK Dragon 2014 in the 2018–19 UEFA Women's Champions League qualifying round.

On 4 November, she made her Toppserien debut against Stabæk

River Plate, 2019–
On October 13, 2019, River Plate signed O'Brien. She made her debut in a 4–0 victory against Porvenir. On February 9, 2020, she scored her debut goal in the 5–0 win over
Estudiantes.

References

External links
 

 Tulsa Golden Hurricane profile
 

1992 births
Living people
People from Huntington Beach, California
Soccer players from California
American women's soccer players
Women's association football midfielders
Tulsa Golden Hurricane women's soccer players
Club Atlético River Plate (women) players
American expatriate women's soccer players
American expatriate sportspeople in Sweden
Expatriate women's footballers in Sweden
American expatriate sportspeople in Iceland
Expatriate women's footballers in Iceland
American expatriate sportspeople in Norway
Expatriate women's footballers in Norway
American expatriate sportspeople in Argentina
Expatriate women's footballers in Argentina